Mint Colony is a monorail station on Line 1 of the Mumbai Monorail located at Wadia Baug, Best Colony in the Parel suburb of Mumbai, India. Lies on the Shri Sai Baba Marg which is nearby Lalbaug Flyover.

References

Mumbai Monorail stations